Nagapattinam taluk is a taluk of Nagapattinam district of the Indian state of Tamil Nadu. The headquarters of the taluk is the town of Nagapattinam

Demographics
According to the 2011 census, the taluk of Nagapattinam had a population of 282,872 with 140,027 males and 142,845 females. There were 1,020 women for every 1,000 men. The taluk had a literacy rate of 77.13%. Child population in the age group below 6 years were 15,333 Males and 14,567 Females.

References 

Taluks of Nagapattinam district